Rennell may refer to:

People
 Baron Rennell
 Rennell Rodd, 1st Baron Rennell (1858–1941), British diplomat, poet and politician
 Francis Rodd, 2nd Baron Rennell (1895–1978), British army officer and diplomat
 Tremayne Rodd, 3rd Baron Rennell (1935–2006), Scottish rugby union player
 James Rennell (1742–1830), British geographer and pioneer oceanographer
 Paul Rennell, New Zealand soccer player
 Thomas Rennell (1754–1840), British clergyman
 Thomas Rennell (scholar) (1787–1824), British theologian and author

Places
 Rennell Island, Solomon Islands
 Rennell and Bellona Province
 Rennell Glacier, Antarctica
 Rennell Sound, Canada
 North Rennell Island, Chile
 South Rennell Island, Chile

Animals
 Rennell fantail
 Rennell flying fox
 Rennell shrikebill
 Rennell starling
 Rennell Island monitor

See also
Renald
Reynolds (disambiguation)